Lau Meng Meng (born 29 May 1983) is a Singaporean footballer.

He is a former Geylang United player and also played for Hougang United FC in the S. League.

References

1983 births
Living people
Singaporean footballers
Association football defenders
Geylang International FC players
Hougang United FC players
Singapore Premier League players
Singaporean sportspeople of Chinese descent